The Frații Buzești National College is a high school located in central Craiova, Romania, on Știrbei Vodă Street. It is one of the most prestigious secondary education institutions in Romania.

History

The high school was named after three loyal noblemen, the Buzești brothers, Preda, Radu and Stroe Buzescu, who were the inseparable, strongest military supporters of voivode Michael the Brave; their noble blood line goes back to 1461 AD. Between 1590 and 1600 they fought valiantly, numerous times in the army of the Christian Prince Michael the Brave against the Ottoman Turks.

As a high school it was formally established in 1882 as "Gimnaziul Real" by an edict of  "Ministerul Cultelor" (approved by minister P.S. Aurelian of the Ministry of Culture of Romania, at that time), with a predominantly science teaching for boys.  The gymnasium motto consists of the two Latin words from the beginning of the Book of Genesis: "Fiat Lux" --"Let There Be Light!".

The first director of the gymnasium was Mathematics Professor Grigore Căzănescu who provided leadership and guidance to both students and professors at the gymnasium. At its opening on November 1, 1882, the gymnasium had 62 students enrolled in the first grade; it opened in the large classroom of the  gymnasium for boys in the building that is now "Colegiul Național Carol I", and its first language teachers were Ștefan Rudeanu for the French and Ferdinand Settelin for the German. By 1898 there were 184 alumni of the gymnasium, but the school did not have its own building until 1930. On January 9, 1910, however, Spiru Haret—then Minister of Education and Culture ("Ministerul Instrucțiunii și Cultelor")-- announced that he approved the gymnasium to be called by the name of "Frații Buzești". At that time, one of its best known teachers was Nicolae Bănescu, professor of history and French language, who became VicePresident of the Romanian Academy. Its study programme was quite strict and severe, and had as many as 34 hours of study per week; it continued much in the same vein even in the early 1960s. By 1961 it also included compulsory, practical training in Electrotechnics engineering at the local works of "ElectroPower" factory for manufacturing electrical train Diesels, with all graduating students receiving certificates for building electrical motors and generators. The school's two rigidly disciplinarian teachers in the 1960s were Sică-Anastasie Petrescu for Mathematics, and Teodoreanu—an elderly Russian Bessarabean—for Physics.

However, the most remarkable head master in the entire history of the school was - between 1920 and 1940- the professor of natural sciences Ion P.Ionescu—Argetoaia, with a doctorate in Geology, who gave up a professorship at the University of Timișoara, as well as an assistant professorship at the Sorbonne, in Paris, in order to join "Frații Buzești" as its leader; he was the first to succeed in securing the approval by the Ministry of Education ("Ministerul Instrucțiunii") for the construction of the monumental building of the high school that continues to be used today. During World War II, between 1941 and 1942, the school's building was used by the German troops as a hospital for wounded German soldiers, and later, between September 1944 and 1949, it was used again—this time by the occupying soviet troops—as a hospital for the wounded Red Army soldiers; during such trying times, the school was forced to operate grossly overcrowded in the buildings of other schools in Craiova. By the year 2005 there were over 15,000 high school graduates of CNFB, its popularity having increased exponentially after the 1930s.

Currently, CNFB is a UNESCO affiliated institution, endowed with high-quality teaching staff, past and present. CNFB's alumni are presently studying and contributing to research and culture at academic institutions throughout the world.

For over a century, the two best 'National Colleges' of Craiova, Colegiul Național "Frații Buzești" (CNFB) and
Colegiul Național Carol I, have been, and still are, the recognized educational paths for the inhabitants of Oltenia--Dolj towards university education; often many alumni of these two best high schools were admitted through very competitive entrance examinations to either the University of Bucharest or the local University of Craiova, with the latter being less than two miles from the buildings of the two high schools.

Headmasters
Director: Prof. Didu Ileana
 Adjunct Directors:
Prof. Carmen Ștefănescu
Prof. Ion Nanu
 Councillor for educational programmes and projects: Prof. Ileana Didu

Students' activities

 CNFB students involve themselves into a large number of scientific and cultural activities organized by the students clubs and/or the "Fraţii Buzeşti" Foundation. There is also a students' magazine and journal published by the school since 1996. (The first students' magazine was however founded in 1963, and then it was promptly censored and suspended by the school's principal, with the student editor being punished).

Alumni
Ilie G. Murgulescu (1902–1991)--physical chemist, Former President of the Romanian Academy
Lt. General Eugeniu Petre P. Mares (1907–1995).
Mircea Grigore(1920–2006)
 Marin Sorescu—Literary historian and poet (1936–1996)
 Alexandru Mitru (1914–1989)-one of the most prolific and well-known Romanian writers of legends and mythological stories
 Sabin Bălașa—Painter (1932–2008)
 Petre C. Raicu, Dr. Phil. (1929–1998), former professor of genetics at the University of Bucharest and Petru Maior University of Târgu Mureş; also an Associate Professor of the University of Paris
 Mihnea Gheorghiu, Academician
 Radu Voinea (1923–2010)--professor of theoretical mechanics and engineering, Former President of the Romanian Academy
 Eugene Ionesco (1909–1994)—-Romanian-French playwright who wrote mostly in French, and one of the foremost figures of the French Avant-garde theatre.

References

Further reading
Pr. Constantin COMAN, Casa creștinului, Editura Bizantină, București, f.a.
Titu Georgescu, Constantin Barbacioru, Florea Firan, Virgil Joita, Constantin Mocanu, Luchian Deaconu, Ion
Dogaru, "Istoria Craiovei", Editura Scrisul Românesc, 1977.
Nicolae Andrei, "Ani de lumină: 1826-1876", Scrisul Românesc, Craiova, 1976
Marin Sorescu "Hands Behind My Back: Selected Poems", trans. Gabriela Dragnea, Adriana Varga, & Stuart
Friebert (Oberlin College Press, 1991). 
The Vintage Book of Contemporary World Poetry, edited by J.D. McClatchy, pg. 219.

External links
 Official site

Schools in Dolj County
Educational institutions established in 1882
Buildings and structures in Craiova
National Colleges in Romania
1882 establishments in Romania